A boilover (or boil-over) type of fire refers to an extremely hazardous situation where an attempt is made to extinguish semi-enclosed oil or petrochemical fueled fire with water. The hazard results due to the difference in density between oil and water.

NFPA defines boil-over as: An event in the burning of certain oils in an open-top tank when, after a long period of quiescent burning, there is a sudden increase in fire intensity associated with expulsion of burning oil from the tank.

Boilover is also common in the home as a chip pan fire when cooking.

Mechanism 
As water is poured onto the fuel, it quickly sinks to the bottom of the container due to the water's higher density, and has little effect on extinguishing the flames on the surface. Under certain conditions, after some time, the water on the bottom rapidly vaporises into steam, causing it to expand more than 1700 times in volume. The rapidly expanding steam (possibly superheated) expels the oil or fuel above upward and out of the tank, resulting in the discharging of burning oil onto a large and uncontrolled area outside of the container.

Mathematical modelling of the phenomenon is difficult and complicated, making boilover prediction unreliable.

See also
Chip pan fire, a common domestic boilover accident
Expansion ratio
Fire extinguisher foams
Fire class#Class F/K
Phreatic eruption - a similar concept in  volcanic eruption
Wax fire

References

External links
 

Fire
Petroleum production
Articles containing video clips